Tirurangadi Bappu Musliyar was a Muslim scholar, poet and  of one of the traditionalist Sunni Muslims in Kerala, India. He was born in 1933 at Tanur, near Tirur in Malappuram district.  He died on 7 August 2014. He was the member of Samastha Kerala Jamiat Ulema (Kerala). Known as Busoori of Kerala, Bappu Musliyar was an Arabic language expert and also a poet.

Awards
Imam Busuri Award

References

Indian Sunni Muslim scholars of Islam
Islam in Kerala
People from Malappuram district
1933 births
2014 deaths
Leaders of Samastha (AP Faction)